

History

The village of Manhala Jai Singh, known in the former times as only Manhala, was founded by the Batth Jatt Zamandirs, west of Patti town in the southern portion of the Majha Region. The Batth Jatt Chaudhries of this village held feudal Jagirs in Manhala, Mughal Wala, and Kulla. The village back then was in the Patti Pargana (being the old district). Guru Hargobind Sahib Jee, the Sixth Sikh Guru, along with some Sikh soldiers, visited Manhala, and stayed opposite the house of Batth Jatt Chaudhries in an open space in the centre of the village. At first a platform was made at the site commemorating the visit of Guru Hargobind Sahib Jee.

In the early mid-1700s, when the Mughal power ended, and was replaced by the Sikh Misls (confederacies), Godh Singh and Uttam Singh, the sons of Chaudhri Bulaki Batth of Manhala, joined the Bhangi Sikh Misl, under Sardar Hari Singh Dhillon. The Batth Sikh sardars were well known in their region. The book (sardar gharaane of Punjab) provided a history of Batth sardars. The lieutenant governor Lepel H.Griffen also talks about Batth sardars of Maniyala Jai singh, in his famous book Chiefs Of Punjab (edition of 1865) The book Chiefs of Punjab contains the history of Rajas of Punjab.

Nearby cities: New Amritsar City, Ferozepur, Amritsar

References
http://apnaorg.com/books/punjab-chiefs/

http://www.panjabdigilib.org/webuser/searches/displayPageContent.jsp?ID=7273&CategoryID=1&Searched=W3GX

Villages in Tarn Taran district